The China Nuclear International Uranium Corporation (中国国核海外铀资源开发公司) (abbreviated as Sino-U or SinoU) is a Chinese Government owned corporation involved in prospecting, and eventually mining, overseas sources of uranium.

In late 2006, SinoU was spun off from the China National Nuclear Corporation (CNNC), China's state owned nuclear processing, mining, plant operation, and research agency, where it was previously the Overseas Uranium Exploitation Department of the CNNC.

Operations 

Its first major contract was to build the Teguida, Niger-based Azelik mine and ore process plant as a joint venture with the Nigerien government run Société Minière d'Azelik.  Initial estimates were that the mine would be operational in 2010.  The deal struck in 2007 was part of a policy shift by then Nigerien president Mamadou Tandja to break the four decade de facto monopoly held by Areva, a French state owned nuclear company, by bringing in Sino-U as a competitor.  The Financial Times described the entry of Sino-U as a "battle for resources" between China and France and illustrated a competition view held by some that saw "China’s pursuit of Africa’s resources as a direct – and potentially destabilising – threat to western interests".

In June 2007, one of SinoU's officials was kidnapped by rebels opposed to the building of the mine, but released shortly after.  With the advent of the Second Tuareg Rebellion, work on the Teguida site was stopped as of August 2007.

See also

Nuclear power in China
 Second Tuareg Rebellion

References

External links
wise-uranium.org.

Governmental nuclear organizations
Uranium mining companies of China
Non-renewable resource companies established in 2006
Chinese companies established in 2006
2006 establishments in China